Francisco Bernardo de Quirós (1580 - 1668) was a Spanish entremesista of the Siglo de Oro.

References

1580 births
1668 deaths